Mollakənd (Also known as, Mollakend, Mollakand  Mollakent, Моллакенд and Mulla) is a village and municipality in the Kurdamir Rayon of Azerbaijan.

References 

Populated places in Kurdamir District